The following highways are numbered 630:

United States
 Interstate 630
 U.S. Route 630 (former)
 U.S. Route 630 (Utah) former proposal)
 Florida State Road 630 (former)
 County Road 630 (Indian River County, Florida)
 Hawaii Route 630 (former)
 Kentucky Route 630
 Louisiana Highway 630 (former)
 Maryland Route 630 (former)
 County Route 630 (Burlington County, New Jersey)
 County Route 630 (Camden County, New Jersey)
 County Route 630 (Cape May County, New Jersey)
 County Route 630 (Cumberland County, New Jersey)
 County Route 630 (Essex County, New Jersey)
 County Route 630 (Gloucester County, New Jersey)
 County Route 630 (Hudson County, New Jersey)
 County Route 630 (Mercer County, New Jersey)
 County Route 630 (Middlesex County, New Jersey)
 County Route 630 (Morris County, New Jersey)
 County Route 630 (Ocean County, New Jersey)
 County Route 630 (Passaic County, New Jersey)
 County Route 630 (Salem County, New Jersey)
 County Route 630 (Somerset County, New Jersey)
 County Route 630 (Sussex County, New Jersey)
 County Route 630 (Union County, New Jersey)
 County Route 630 (Warren County, New Jersey)
 Ohio State Route 630
 Farm to Market Road 630
 Virginia State Route 630
 Virginia State Route 630 (1930-1933) (former)

Territories
 Puerto Rico Highway 630